Thomas Mitchell (27 June 1905–1970) was an English footballer who played in the Football League for Blackburn Rovers, Hartlepools United, Lincoln City and Stockport County.

References

1905 births
1970 deaths
English footballers
Association football forwards
English Football League players
Hartlepool United F.C. players
Stockport County F.C. players
Blackburn Rovers F.C. players
Lincoln City F.C. players
Darlington Town F.C. players